Boussens may refer to:

 Boussens, Vaud, Switzerland
 Boussens, Haute-Garonne, France